The 19th Army Corps was an Army corps in the Imperial Russian Army.

Composition
In 1914, the corps included the following units.
17th Infantry Division
38th Infantry Division
7th Cavalry Division
1st Don Cossack Division

Part of
5th Army: 1914 – 1915
1st Army: 1915
5th Army: 1916 – 1917

Commanders
1905: Lieutenant general Dmitry Rezvoi
1909: Engineer general Evgraf Saranchov
May 1914 – June 1915: Vladimir Gorbatovsky
November 1915 – April 1917: Anthony Veselovsky

References

External links
 Русская армия в Великой войне: Картотека формирований
 
 Военный энциклопедический словарь. М., Военное издательство, 1984. Галицийская битва 1914, с. 178; Галич-Львовская операция 1914, с. 178; Люблин-Холмская операция, с. 411; Юго-Западный фронт 1914–1917, с. 838; 
 Зайончковский A.M. Первая мировая война — СПб.: Полигон, 2002.
  Сайт Web creation. Битвы во время Галицийской операции. 5-я русская армия (25-й, 19-й, 5-й, 17-й корпуса)

Corps of the Russian Empire